Concepción Province is one of nine provinces in the Junín Region in central Peru. Its capital is Concepción.

Notable sites include "El convento de Santa Rosa de Ocopa", which contains a vast library and artefacts that were acquired from the first Spanish expeditions to the Peruvian Amazon rainforest.

Geography 
The Huaytapallana mountain range traverses the province.

Some of the highest peaks of the province are:

Political division
The province is divided into seventeen districts (singular: distrito), each of which is headed by a mayor (alcalde):

 Concepción
Aco
Andamarca
Chambara
Cochas
Comas
Heroínas Toledo
Manzanares
Mariscal Castilla
Matahuasi
Mito
Nueve de Julio
Orcotuna
San José
Santa Rosa de Ocopa

References

External links
 Municipal website 

Provinces of the Junín Region